Ole Braunschweig (born 15 November 1997) is a German swimmer. He competed in the men's 100 metre backstroke at the 2020 Summer Olympics.

References

External links
 

1997 births
Living people
German male swimmers
German male backstroke swimmers
Olympic swimmers of Germany
Swimmers at the 2020 Summer Olympics
Swimmers from Berlin
20th-century German people
21st-century German people
European Aquatics Championships medalists in swimming